Ernest Wool Lewis (5 April 1867 – 19 April 1930) was a British amateur lawn tennis player who was active at the end of the 19th century.

Career
Ernest Lewis reached the final of the first Wimbledon Championships gentlemen's doubles competition held in 1884. Partnering E.L. Williams they lost the final to the famous tennis brothers Ernest Renshaw and William Renshaw in four sets. With partner George Hillyard he reached and lost the 1889 and 1890 gentlemen's doubles finals.

In 1892 he won his first and only Wimbledon title when together with Harry S. Barlow they defeated another famous team of tennis brothers, Herbert Baddeley and Wilfred Baddeley, in four sets.

In total Lewis would reach seven doubles finals at the Wimbledon Championships during his career (1884,1889, 1890, 1892, 1893, 1894, 1895).

In the gentlemen's singles competition at Wimbledon his best result was reaching the final of the all-comers tournament on four occasions (1886, 1888, 1892 and 1894). In 1886 Lawford beat Ernest Renshaw from 2 sets to 0 down in the quarter finals before losing the all comers final to Herbert Lawford in five sets. In 1888 he lost the all comers final to Ernest Renshaw in four sets. In 1892 Lewis led 2 sets to 0 against Joshua Pim in the all comers final but lost in five sets. In 1894 he won against Herbert Baddeley in the semifinal in a close five set match but was solidly defeated in the final by Wilfred Baddeley, 0–6, 1–6, 0–6.

Lewis won the singles title at the Irish Championships in 1890 after a close–fought battle in the challenge round against Willoughby Hamilton, 3–6, 3–6, 9–7, 6–4, 7–5. He defended his Irish title in 1891 in a straight sets victory over Irishman Joshua Pim. In 1892 he was victorious at the London Championships at the Queens Club, defeating Joshua Pim in the final.

He won the singles title at the British Covered Court Championships seven times; in 1887, 1888, 1889, 1890, 1891, 1895 and 1896. The first five titles were won when the tournament was played at its original location in Hyde Park, the last two titles were won at the Queen's Club in London. He also won the Middlesex Championships at Chiswick Park four times consecutivley from 1887 to 1890, and fifth title again in 1892. His other career singles highlights include winning the Gore Court Championships at Sittingbourne in 1885, the South Saxons Tournament at St Leonards-on-Sea in 1889.

Grand Slam finals

Singles (4 runners-up)

Doubles (1 title, 6 runners-up)

References

External links

 

19th-century English people
19th-century male tennis players
Wimbledon champions (pre-Open Era)
1867 births
1930 deaths
Grand Slam (tennis) champions in men's doubles
People from Hammersmith
English male tennis players
British male tennis players
Tennis people from Greater London